The Savannah Archaeological Site  in Hardin County, Tennessee, is a prehistoric complex of platform mounds and village of the South Appalachian Mississippian culture, a regional variation of Mississippian culture.

Site description
The Mississippian culture village and mound complex is located on the eastern bank of the Tennessee River and is covered by the modern city of Savannah, Tennessee. The 16 mounds form a zig-zag line of nearly a mile along the Tennessee River. A trench circling along the east side of this line connects with the river, at the north end and at the south end, thus the river to the west and the trench to the east, entirely encircled this ancient village. These have never been extensively excavated.

In 1830, David Robinson, a wealthy landowner and local planter, built a Federal-style home overlooking the Tennessee River on one of the mounds. The house is now known as the Cherry Mansion.

See also
Shiloh Indian Mounds Site
Swallow Bluff Island Mounds
List of Mississippian sites

References

South Appalachian Mississippian culture
Archaeological sites in Tennessee
Geography of Hardin County, Tennessee
Mounds in Tennessee